John Lee (born 23 May 1986) is an Irish hurler who played as a centre-back for the Galway senior hurling team.

An All-Ireland-winning captain in the minor grade, Lee made his first appearance for the senior team during the 2007 championship and became a regular member of the team over the next four seasons. During that time he failed to claim any honours at senior level.

At club level Lee plays with the Liam Mellows club. While a medical student at NUI Galway he won a Fitzgibbon Cup in 2010, having campaigned for the University team for six years, including being part of the side that had lost the 2007 final. He was conferred with a M.B. B.Ch., B.A.O. at a ceremony in the University in June 2010.

References

 

1986 births
Living people
Alumni of the University of Galway
Connacht inter-provincial hurlers
Galway inter-county hurlers
Liam Mellows hurlers
University of Galway hurlers
21st-century Irish medical doctors